Schonland is a surname. Notable people with the surname include:

Basil Schonland (1896–1972), South African physicist
Herbert Emery Schonland (1900–1984), United States Navy Medal of Honor recipient
Selmar Schonland (1860–1940), South African botanist

See also
Schönland